This is a list of airlines currently operating in Mauritius.

See also
 List of airlines
 List of defunct airlines of Mauritius

Mauritius
Airlines
Airlines
Mauritius